Merete Wiger (January 3, 1921 – December 24, 2015) was a Norwegian novelist, author of short stories, children's writer and playwright.  She made her literary debut in 1957 with the novel Så låste hun seg inn. Her novel  - grensen from 1965 is written in the form of a diary of an imprisoned women who tries to explain why she murdered her husband, but it later turns out her husband is alive and the woman is actually locked up in a mental institution. Wiger was awarded the Gyldendal's Endowment in 1970.

References

1921 births
2015 deaths
People from Trondheim
20th-century Norwegian novelists
21st-century Norwegian novelists
Norwegian children's writers
Norwegian dramatists and playwrights
Norwegian women short story writers
Norwegian women novelists
Norwegian women children's writers
Norwegian women dramatists and playwrights
21st-century Norwegian women writers
20th-century Norwegian women writers
20th-century Norwegian short story writers
21st-century Norwegian short story writers